Frank Griffith may refer to:
Frank Griffith (cricketer) (born 1968), English cricketer
F. Kingsley Griffith (1889–1962), British politician, barrister and judge
Frank Griffith (baseball) (1872–1908), Major League baseball player

See also
Francis Griffith (disambiguation)